Aemene punctigera is a moth of the family Erebidae. It was described by John Henry Leech in 1899. It is found in western and central China.

References

Cisthenina
Moths described in 1899
Moths of Asia